Trang railway station is a railway station located in Thap Thiang Subdistrict, Trang City, Trang. The station opened in April 1913 on the Southern Line section Kantang–Huai Yot. Trang Station is the alighting point for easier access to islands in the Andaman Sea. 

The station building has been in use since 1913 until it was demolished and rebuilt in 1969 until now. As a result of the establishment of a railway station in 1913, the surrounding area has built various buildings such as hotels or shophouses on Rama VI Road, the first official road of the Trang. In the past, when the transportation was not prosperous, residents of other provinces such as Phuket or Surat Thani must use this station to travel by train to Bangkok. Most of the buildings on Rama VI Road are Sino-Portuguese architecture.

Train services 
 Express No. 83 / 84 Krung Thep Aphiwat – Trang – Krung Thep Aphiwat
 Rapid No. 167 / 168 Krung Thep Aphiwat – Kantang – Krung Thep Aphiwat

References 
 
 

Railway stations in Thailand
Trang province
Railway stations opened in 1913
1913 establishments in Siam